Parliamentary elections were held in Transnistria on 11 December 2005. They were won by the Obnovlenie, an NGO which, together with their allies, beat long-time President Igor Smirnov's Republic party. Following its victory, in June 2006, Obnovlenie was registered as a political party.

Results
According to PMR data, only 15 of the 43 members of its parliament (MPs) were born in the PMR territory (including 12 in Transnistria proper, and 3 in the Bessarabian area in and around the city of Bender, which is controlled by PMR), while 4 others in the rest of Moldova, with the remainder mainly born in Russia or Ukraine. Igor Smirnov, the leader of PMR, arrived in the region in 1987. Most of the MPs who were born elsewhere had moved to the region ten years or more before the conflict erupted.

Aftermath
The victory of Obnovlenie enabled the party to change the long-term speaker of the Supreme Council, Grigore Mărăcuţă. On 28 December 2005, the leader of Renewal, Yevgeny Shevchuk was elected new speaker.

References

External links 
  Olvia Press: List of elected MPs (12 December 2005)

Elections in Transnistria
2005 elections in Moldova
2005 in Transnistria
Election and referendum articles with incomplete results